Alyaksandr Khatskevich (born 19 October 1973) is a Belarusian football manager and former player.

Playing career
Khatskevich is a former player of the Ukrainian club Dynamo Kyiv.

He made 39 appearances and scored four goals for the Belarus national team from 1993 to 2005.

Managerial career
After Khatskevich retired from playing, Khatskevich became a football coach. At age 33, his former club, FC Dinamo Minsk, appointed him to replace Pyotr Kachura after the first match of the 2007 Belarusian Premier League season.

From December 2014 until December 2016 he was the head coach of Belarus national team.

On 20 December 2019, he signed with Russian Football National League club FC Rotor Volgograd. The club only played two games after the resumption of the 2019–20 season after the winter break and then the season was abandoned due to the COVID-19 pandemic in Russia. As Rotor were leading the league at the time of abandonment, the club was promoted to the Russian Premier League. He was dismissed by Rotor on 19 March 2021, with the club in the 13th position in the league.

Personal life
His son Artyom Khatskevich plays for the reserve squad of Dynamo Kyiv and in summer 2021 he moved on loan to Desna-3 Chernihiv one the reserve squad of Desna Chernihiv.

Career statistics
Scores and results list Belarus' goal tally first, score column indicates score after each Khatskevich goal.

Managerial statistics

Honours

Player
Dinamo Minsk
Belarusian Premier League: 1992–93, 1993–94, 1994–95, 1995, 1996
Belarusian Cup: 1993–94

Dynamo Kyiv
Ukrainian Premier League: 1996–97, 1997–98, 1998–99, 1999–2000, 2000–01, 2002–03, 2003–04
Ukrainian Cup: 1997–98, 1998–99, 1999–2000, 2002–03
Ukrainian Super Cup: 2004

Manager
Dynamo Kyiv
Ukrainian Super Cup: 2018, 2019

References

External links
 
 

1973 births
Living people
Footballers from Minsk
Association football midfielders
Belarusian footballers
Belarus international footballers
Belarus under-21 international footballers
Belarusian expatriate footballers
Expatriate footballers in Ukraine
Expatriate footballers in China
Expatriate footballers in Latvia
Belarusian expatriate sportspeople in Ukraine
Belarusian expatriate sportspeople in China
Belarusian expatriate sportspeople in Latvia
Belarusian Premier League players
Ukrainian Premier League players
Ukrainian First League players
Ukrainian Second League players
Chinese Super League players
FC Dinamo-93 Minsk players
FC Dinamo Minsk players
FC Dynamo Kyiv players
FC Dynamo-2 Kyiv players
FC Dynamo-3 Kyiv players
Tianjin Jinmen Tiger F.C. players
FK Venta players
Belarusian football managers
Belarusian expatriate football managers
Expatriate football managers in Ukraine
FC Dinamo Minsk managers
FC Vitebsk managers
Dynamo Kyiv Football Academy managers
FC Dynamo-2 Kyiv managers
Belarus national football team managers
FC Dynamo Kyiv managers
Ukrainian Premier League managers
Ukrainian First League managers
FC Rotor Volgograd managers
Expatriate football managers in Russia
Belarusian expatriate sportspeople in Russia
Russian Premier League managers
Karmiotissa FC managers
Expatriate football managers in Cyprus